Callionymus kotthausi, Kotthaus’ deepwater dragonet, is a species of dragonet found only in the Indian Ocean off India where it occurs at depths of from . The specific name honours the Swiss ichthyologist Adolf Kotthaus.

References 

K
Fish described in 1981
Taxa named by Ronald Fricke